were a class of riverine gunboats of the Imperial Japanese Navy. 
The class consisted of two ships, Fushimi (伏見) and Sumida (隅田).

Design and armament
Both ships were armed with one  anti-aircraft gun, and two  machine guns.

Operational history
Both ships, Fushimi and Sumida, were laid down in 1939, and were completed in 1939 and 1940, respectively.

References

Citations

Books

 
1939 ships
Riverine warfare
Gunboat classes